Morley is both a surname and a given name. The name is toponymic, derived from several places in the United Kingdom —from the Old English words "mor" ("marsh"), and "le-ah" ("a clearing in the woods"). Notable people with the name include:

Surname:
 Aaron Morley (born 2000), English footballer
Ada McPherson Morley (1852-1917), American suffragist and activist
 Adrian Morley (born 1977), English rugby league footballer
 Angela Morley (1924–2009), English composer and conductor
 Beric Morley (1943–2015), British architectural historian
 Bert Morley (1882–1957),   English international footballer
 Clarence Morley (1869–1948), American politician, 24th governor of Colorado, member of the Ku Klux Klan
 Christopher Morley (1890–1957), American writer and editor
 Christopher Morley (actor) (born 1951), American actor
 David Morley (paediatrician) (1923–2009), British paediatrician
 David Morley (footballer) (1977), Retired British Footballer
 Ebenezer Cobb Morley (1831–1924), English sportsman regarded as the father of the Football Association and modern football
 Edith Morley (1875–1964), English literary scholar
 Edward W. Morley (1838–1923), American scientist
 Elizabeth Morley, 18th-century English silversmith
 Elliot Morley (born 1952), former English politician
 Eric Morley (1918–2000), British founder of the Miss World pageant
 Felix Morley (1894–1982), American journalist
 Frank Morley (1860–1937), British mathematician
 Fred Morley (1850–1884), British cricketer
 George Morley (1598–1684), English Anglican bishop
 Harry Morley (1881–1943), British artist
 Henry Morley (1822–1894), British writer
 Henry Morley (cricketer) (1785–1857), English cricketer
 Isaac Morley (1786–1865), American early member of the Latter Day Saint movement
 Jack Morley (1909–1972), Welsh rugby player
 John Morley, 1st Viscount Morley of Blackburn (1838–1923), British politician and Secretary of State for India
 John David Morley (1948–2018), English novelist
 Karen Morley (1909–2003), American actor and political activist
 Lawrence Morley (1920-2013), Canadian geophysicist
 Lewis Morley (1925–2013), English photographer
 Luke Morley (born 1960), English musician
 Malcolm Morley (1931-2018), British-American artist 
 Michael D. Morley (1930–2020), American mathematician
 Nathan Morley (born 1974), British television journalist and host
 P. J. Morley (1931–2012), former Irish politician 
 Pat Morley (footballer) (born 1965), former Irish footballer
 Pat Morley, drummer for Soul Asylum from 1983 to 1984
 Paul Morley (born 1957), British journalist of the music scene
 Peter Morley (filmmaker) (1924–2016), German-born British documentary filmmaker
 Robert Morley (1908–1992), British actor
 Ruth Morley (1925–1991), Austrian-born American costume designer 
 Samuel Morley (VC) (1829–1888), English recipient of the Victoria Cross
 Sean Morley (born 1971), Canadian wrestler
 Steve Morley (born 1981), Canadian football player
 Sylvanus Morley (1883–1948), American archaeologist, epigrapher and Mayanist scholar
 Thomas Morley (1557 or 1558 – 1602), English composer
 Trevor Morley (born 1961), English football player

Given name:
 Morley Baer (1916-1995), American artist, photographer and teacher
 Morley Callaghan (1903–1990), Canadian novelist, short story writer, playwright and broadcaster
 Morley Griswold (1890–1951), American politician, 16th governor of Nevada
 Morley Safer (1931–2016), Canadian news reporter
 Morley Shih (born 1950), Taiwanese lawyer
 Morley (artist) (born 1982), Los Angeles street artist
 Morley (singer), American singer-songwriter
  (モーリー・ロバートソン), American-Japanese television personality

See also
Maury (name)

References

English-language surnames
English toponymic surnames